Jula may refer to:

Places
Jula, the German name of Gyula, a town in Hungary
Bareh Jula, a village in Iran
Jula Deh, a village in Iran
Jula Kamar, a village in Iran

Other
 Jula (name)
 Dioula language spoken in western Africa
 Jula or Dyula people, western Africa

Language and nationality disambiguation pages